This is a list of islands of Puerto Rico.

The Commonwealth of Puerto Rico has over 143 islands, keys, islets, and atolls.  Only the main island of Puerto Rico and the islands of Vieques, and Culebra are inhabited. Mona Island has personnel from the Puerto Rico Department of Natural and Environmental Resources (DNER) stationed year-around but no private citizens inhabit it (other than overnight camping guests and nature enthusiasts). Caja de Muertos Island is also a DNER Nature Reserve, while Desecheo Island is a National Wildlife Refuge administrated by the US Fish and Wildlife Service.

The other 140 islands, keys, islets and atolls are not inhabited. Some islands are privately-owned: Isla Palomino, which is rented on a long-term lease to El Conquistador Hotel, Isleta Marina, Isla de Ramos and Isla de Lobos.

Table

See also

 List of communities in Puerto Rico
 List of Caribbean islands#Puerto Rico

References

 
Islands
Puerto Rico
Caribbean islands of the United States